Salvia tolimensis is a perennial shrub endemic to a very small region in Colombia (Tolima) growing on streamsides, scrublands, and forest edges in wet conditions at  elevation.

Notes

tolimensis
Endemic flora of Colombia